Visual privacy is the relationship between collection and dissemination of visual information, the expectation of privacy, and the legal issues surrounding them. These days digital cameras are ubiquitous. They are one of the most common sensors found in electronic devices, ranging from smartphones to tablets, and laptops to surveillance cams. However, privacy and trust implications surrounding it limit its ability to seamlessly blend into computing environment. In particular, large-scale camera networks have created increasing interest in understanding the advantages and disadvantages of such deployments. It is estimated that over 4 million CCTV cameras deployed in the UK.  Due to increasing security concerns, camera networks have continued to proliferate across other countries such as the United States.  While the impact of such systems continues to be evaluated, in parallel, tools for controlling how these camera networks are used and modifications to the images and video sent to end-users have been explored.

Technologies

To enhance visual privacy, a number of different technologies have been suggested.

Forms of Visual Data
Visual Privacy is often typically applied to particular technologies including:
 Closed-circuit television (CCTVs)
 Visual sensor network (Also referred to as Camera Networks)
 Camera phone
Smart homes

Systems
Many different forms of technologies are explored to preserve privacy while providing information collected from camera networks. Most of these solutions rely upon the target application and try to accomplish it in a privacy-preserving manner:
 "Respectful Cameras" is a solution that automatically obscures the faces of observed people in video by overlaying a colored dot over the face of the individual.  This technology tracks colored markers, worn by individuals, and then infers the location of a face by an offset from the marker.  
 Google Streetview uses automatic face-detection to blur all faces in the city of Manhattan.
 Eptascape has a product which provides automatic people tracking and provides privacy-enabled surveillance.
 Cardea is a context-aware visual privacy protection mechanism that protects bystanders' visual privacy in photos according to their context-dependent privacy preferences, using face recognition and context computing techniques.
Thermal and depth cameras are used in person detection and people counting.
 Privacy-preserving Lens design  consists of the joint optimization of optics and algorithms to perform vision tasks like human pose estimation and action recognition.

Visual privacy hence encompasses privacy aware and privacy preserving systems which factor in the compute design choices, privacy policies regarding data-sharing in a collaborative and distributive environment and data ownership itself. At times privacy and trust are interlinked especially for the adoption and wide-scale acceptance of any technology. Having a fair and accurate computer vision model goes a long way into ensuring the prior two. A lot of developers are also now inculcating perspectives from Privacy by design. These include but are not limited to processing all user sensitive data on the edge client device, decreasing data retentivity, and ensuring that the data is not used for anything it is not intended for.

References

External links
 Unblinking: New Perspectives on Visual Privacy in the 21st Century

Privacy